Saint-Pierre is a town and comune in the Aosta Valley region of north-western Italy. There are about 150 medieval castles, tours and fortified houses in the Aosta Valley. The main sight is the Saint-Pierre Castle. Nearby, the Sarriod family built the Sarriod de la Tour Castle.

Geography

It is situated near the Italian entrance of the Mont Blanc Tunnel, near the confluence of the Buthier and the Doire baltée, and near the junction of the Great and Little St. Bernard routes.

Twin towns — sister cities
Saint-Pierre is twinned with:

  Saint-Pierre-en-Faucigny, France

Main sights
Saint-Pierre Castle

Notes and references

External links
"Saint-Pierre",  Office for Tourism, Sports, Trade and Transport, Autonomous Region of Aosta Valley, 2017.  http://www.lovevda.it/en/database/3/proprieta-denom_ing-non-trovata-il-nome-della-proprieta-e-case-sensitive-e-per-ciascuna-tipologia-di-campo-deve-essere-uniforme-verificare-il-mapping-dell-entita/aosta-valley/saint-pierre/422

Cities and towns in Aosta Valley